Cureton House is a historic home located near Lancaster, Lancaster County, South Carolina. It was built about 1840, and is a two-story, L-shaped, frame Greek Revival style residence.  It is sheathed in clapboard siding and has cross-gable roof and brick pier foundation. The house has a central hall plan and two rooms in the rear ell.  Also on the property is a  cotton storage shed (c. 1918), barn (c. 1930), and garage (c. 1930).

It was added to the National Register of Historic Places in 1990.

References

Houses on the National Register of Historic Places in South Carolina
Greek Revival houses in South Carolina
Houses completed in 1840
Houses in Lancaster County, South Carolina
National Register of Historic Places in Lancaster County, South Carolina